Fabbroni is a small lunar impact crater that lies along the northern edge of the Mare Tranquillitatis, at the eastern edge of the gap where the lunar mare joins Mare Serenitatis to the north. To the southeast is the crater Vitruvius.

Fabbroni is named after the Italian economist, chemist and naturalist Giovanni Fabbroni. It was previously designated Vitruvius E.

This is a circular crater with a conical interior formed by the inner walls gradually sloping down to the tiny floor at the midpoint. The northern rim of this crater lies along the southeastern flanks of the peak Mons Argaeus.

References

External links

Fabbroni at The Moon Wiki
 LTO-42C3 Dawes — L&PI topographic map
 Meandering - LRO's close-up of the image of the western inner slope of Fabbroni

Impact craters on the Moon